Sea of Silence is a 2003 Belgian drama film directed by Stijn Coninx. It was selected as the Belgian entry for the Best Foreign Language Film at the 76th Academy Awards, but it was not nominated.

Cast
 Huub Stapel as Mees Werner sr.
 Johanna ter Steege as Ita Werner
 Neeltje de Vree as Caro Werner
 Nyk Runia as Mees Werner jr.
 Yannic Pieters as Bram Werner
 Julia Van Lisenburg as Annette Werner
 Isabel Leur as Lettie Werner
 Anneke Blok as Tante Connie

See also
 List of submissions to the 76th Academy Awards for Best Foreign Language Film
 List of Belgian submissions for the Academy Award for Best International Feature Film

References

External links
 

2003 films
2003 drama films
Belgian drama films
2000s Dutch-language films
Dutch-language Belgian films